Akagündüz is a Turkish given name and surname, which may refer to

Akagündüz Kutbay (1934–1979), Turkish musician
 Muhammet Akagündüz, Turkish-born Austrian footballer

Turkish masculine given names
Turkish-language surnames